Pasir Bedamar is a state constituency in Perak, Malaysia, that has been represented in the Perak State Legislative Assembly.

This constituency mandated to return a single member to the Perak State Legislative Assembly under the first past the post voting system.

Demographics

History

Polling districts
According to the federal gazette issued on 30 March 2018, the Pasir Bedamar constituency is divided into 19 polling districts.

Representation history

Election Results

References 

Perak state constituencies